Lethe chandica, the angled  red forester, is a species of Satyrinae butterfly found in the  Indomalayan realm.

Subspecies
In Seitz 

 L. c. chandica Northwest India to Peninsular Malaya, Sumatra and Yunnan
L. c. namura  Fruhstorfer, 1911 Peninsular Malaya, Sumatra
L. c. marga   Fruhstorfer, 1911 Java
L. c. ratnacri   Fruhstorfer, 1908  Taiwan
L. c. coelestis   Leech, [1892] West China
L. c. flanona   Fruhstorfer, 1911 Assam
L. c. suvarna   Fruhstorfer, 1908 Laos, North Vietnam, Hainan
L. c. negrito   (C. & R. Felder, 1863) Philippines (Luzon)
L. c. sisapon   Fruhstorfer, 1911 Philippines (Mindoro)
L. c. byzaccus   Fruhstorfer, 1911 Philippines (Mindanao)
L. c. jomaria   Fruhstorfer, 1911 Sulu Islands
L. c. ratnapandi   Fruhstorfer, 1911 Palawan

References

chandica
Butterflies of Asia
Butterflies of Indochina